William Preston Kimball (November 4, 1857 – February 24, 1926) was a U.S. Representative from Kentucky.

Born near East Hickman, Kentucky, Kimball attended public and private schools and Transylvania University in Lexington.
He served as member of the Kentucky House of Representatives in 1883 and 1884.
City clerk in 1889 and 1890.
He studied law.
He was admitted to the bar in 1891 and commenced practice in Lexington.
City attorney of Lexington from October 1891 to January 1, 1901.
He served as prosecuting attorney of Fayette County from January 1, 1901, to March 4, 1907, when he resigned, having been elected to Congress.

Kimball was elected as a Democrat to the Sixtieth Congress (March 4, 1907 – March 3, 1909). He was an unsuccessful candidate for renomination in 1908. He resumed the practice of law in Lexington.

He died in Lexington, Kentucky, February 24, 1926. He was interred in Lexington Cemetery.

References

1857 births
1926 deaths
Transylvania University alumni
Kentucky lawyers
Democratic Party members of the Kentucky House of Representatives
Democratic Party members of the United States House of Representatives from Kentucky
People from Fayette County, Kentucky
19th-century American lawyers